Jacques Saurin (January 6, 1677 – December 30, 1730) was a major French religious figure in the late 17th century and early 18th century who was particularly well-known as a preacher. While he began his career as a Catholic priest, Saurin ultimately converted and became a pastor of the Reformed Church of France.

Early life and education 
Jacques Saurin was born in Nîmes, France on January 6, 1677. He was the oldest child of Jean Saurin (1632-1705), a lawyer and the secretary of the Academy of Nîmes, and Hippolyte de Tournière. Jacques Saurin had three younger siblings: Louis, Marc-Antoine, and Anne-Marie. Saurin and his siblings were raised as huguenots.

In 1685, when the Edict of Nantes was revoked by Louis XIV, Saurin and his family were forced to flee from France. The family ultimately settled in Geneva, Switzerland. There, Saurin studied theology and philosophy.

Saurin's studies were briefly interrupted in 1694, when he decided to volunteer to serve in the army of Victor Amadeus II of Sardinia during the Nine Years' War against Louis XIV. He remained in the army until the Treaty of Ryswick was signed in 1697. He then returned to his studies in Geneva where he was taught by Louis Tronchin, Bénédict Pictet, and Jean-Alphonse Turretin. He completed his studies on July 5, 1700.

Career 
While Saurin lived in Geneva, he embraced Catholicism and decided to become a Catholic priest after completing his studies. Specifically, he found success preaching in Montpellier.

In 1700, Saurin moved briefly to Holland before settling in London, England. There, in 1701 he was appointed to serve as a pastor for a Walloon church. He also served as a chaplain for a regiment of soldiers stationed in England.

London's weather, unfortunately, did not agree with Saurin's health, and after only four years, he decided to leave England. In 1705, he settled in The Hague. There, he underwent a religious conversion experience and became a pastor of the Reformed Church of France.

Personal life 
In 1703, Saurin married Catherine Boitoult. Together, they had five children between 1707 and 1724: Philippe, Antoine, Jeanne-Isabelle, Jacques-Antoine and Guillaume-Sicco.

His brother Louis moved to Ireland around 1727. He had numerous descendants, of whom the most notable was his grandson William Saurin, for many years Attorney General for Ireland, and a key figure in the Irish administration.

Major works 
 Sermons sur divers textes de l'Écriture Sainte, The Hague, 1708-1725
 Discours historiques, critiques, théologiques et moraux sur les événements les plus mémorables du Vieux et du Nouveau Testament, Amsterdam, 1720-1728
 Abrégé de la théologie et de la morale chrétiennes, en forme de catéchisme, Amsterdam, 1722
 État du christianisme en France, The Hague, 1725
 Nouveau Sermons sur la Passion, Rotterdam, 1732

References

External links 
 Jacques Saurin sermons, 1792 at Pitts Theology Library, Candler School of Theology, Emory University

1677 births
1730 deaths
French religious leaders
French Christians